Bruce Plateau is an ice-covered plateau, at least  long and about  high, extending northeast from the heads of Gould Glacier and Erskine Glacier to the vicinity of Flandres Bay, in Graham Land. It borders Avery Plateau on the south and Forbidden Plateau on the north. The first sighting of this plateau has not been ascertained, but it was presumably seen in January 1909 by members of the French Antarctic Expedition under Jean-Baptiste Charcot from their position in Pendleton Strait. The plateau was mapped from aerial photographs and from Falkland Islands Dependencies Survey surveys, 1946–62, and named by the UK Antarctic Place-Names Committee after William S. Bruce, a Scottish polar explorer and leader of the Scottish National Antarctic Expedition, 1902–04.

Central plateaus of Graham Land
North to south:
 Laclavère Plateau
 Louis Philippe Plateau
 Detroit Plateau
 Herbert Plateau
 Foster Plateau
 Forbidden Plateau
 Bruce Plateau
 Avery Plateau
 Hemimont Plateau

References 

Plateaus of Antarctica
Landforms of Graham Land
Graham Coast